These are the Polish number one albums of 2012, per the OLiS Chart.

Chart history

References 

Number-one albums
Poland
2012